Montvale is a borough in northern Bergen County, in the U.S. state of New Jersey, bordering the state of New York. The borough is part of the New York City metropolitan area. As of the 2020 United States census, the borough's population was 8,436, an increase of 592 (+7.5%) from the 2010 census count of 7,844, which in turn reflected an increase of 810 (+11.5%) from the 7,034 counted at the 2000 census.

History
Montvale was incorporated as a borough on August 31, 1894, from portions of Orvil Township and Washington Township. The borough was formed during the "Boroughitis" phenomenon then sweeping through Bergen County, in which 26 boroughs were formed in the county in 1894 alone. On February 15, 1896, Montvale acquired part of Orvil Township. In 1906, Montvale added further land from Orvil and Washington townships, and in 1912, Montvale added territory from Upper Saddle River. On May 20, 1959, portions of Montvale were passed to River Vale, and on December 9 and 14, 1965, territories were exchanged between Montvale and Upper Saddle River. The borough's name is derived from its topography.

Montvale is nicknamed "The Pride of the Pascack Valley".

Geography
According to the U.S. Census Bureau, the borough had a total area of 4.03 square miles (10.45 km2), including 4.02 square miles (10.42 km2) of land and 0.01 square miles (0.03 km2) of water (0.25%).

The borough borders six neighboring municipalities: Park Ridge, River Vale, Upper Saddle River and Woodcliff Lake in Bergen County; and both Pearl River (in the Town of Orangetown) and Chestnut Ridge (in the Town of Ramapo) in Rockland County, New York.

Unincorporated communities, localities and place names located partially or completely within the township include Chestnut Ridge.

Montvale is served by the Garden State Parkway at exits 171 and 172, as well as the New York State Thruway in Chestnut Ridge.

Demographics

2010 census

The Census Bureau's 2006–2010 American Community Survey showed that (in 2010 inflation-adjusted dollars) median household income was $111,633 (with a margin of error of +/− $13,448) and the median family income was $140,026 (+/− $14,508). Males had a median income of $100,000 (+/− $13,987) versus $55,000 (+/− $4,957) for females. The per capita income for the borough was $53,974 (+/− $7,262). About 3.6% of families and 5.3% of the population were below the poverty line, including 10.4% of those under age 18 and 1.5% of those age 65 or over.

Same-sex couples headed 10 households in 2010, an increase from the 8 counted in 2010.

2000 census
As of the 2000 United States census, there were 7,034 people, 2,509 households, and 1,999 families residing in the borough. The population density was 1,769.8 people per square mile (684.1/km2). There were 2,590 housing units at an average density of 651.7 per square mile (251.9/km2). The racial makeup of the borough was 92.79% White, 0.44% African American, 0.09% Native American, 5.36% Asian, 0.63% from other races, and 0.70% from two or more races. Hispanic or Latino of any race were 3.09% of the population.

There were 2,509 households, out of which 37.7% had children under the age of 18 living with them, 71.4% were married couples living together, 6.1% had a female householder with no husband present, and 20.3% were non-families. 17.4% of all households were made up of individuals, and 7.3% had someone living alone who was 65 years of age or older. The average household size was 2.80 and the average family size was 3.18.

In the borough, the population was spread out, with 25.9% under the age of 18, 5.5% from 18 to 24, 27.7% from 25 to 44, 28.2% from 45 to 64, and 12.6% who were 65 years of age or older. The median age was 40 years. For every 100 females, there were 97.1 males. For every 100 females age 18 and over, there were 93.4 males.

The median income for a household in the borough was $93,031, and the median income for a family was $104,047. Males had a median income of $80,355 versus $37,440 for females. The per capita income for the borough was $45,448. About 0.9% of families and 0.9% of the population were below the poverty line, including 0.4% of those under age 18 and 1.0% of those age 65 or over.

Economy
Montvale is home to the corporate headquarters of numerous major companies including Sharp Corporation (U.S. headquarters) and Benjamin Moore. In January 2015, Mercedes-Benz USA announced that they would be moving their headquarters from New Jersey to the Atlanta area later that year. The company had been based in North Jersey since 1972 and had 1,000 employees on a  campus in Montvale. Despite incentive offers from the State of New Jersey to remain in Bergen County, Mercedes-Benz cited proximity to manufacturing facilities and a growing customer base in the southeast in addition to as much as $50 million in tax incentives from Georgia governmental agencies. The borough was the world headquarters for The Great Atlantic & Pacific Tea Company (parent company of  supermarket chains including A&P Markets, Pathmark and Waldbaum's) from the 1970s until its bankruptcy in 2015.

Montvale is home to the operational headquarters of Ingersoll Rand, Pentax and KPMG have a large local presence.  The international marketing and commercial services headquarters of Western Union are located in Montvale.

The Shoppes at DePiero's Farm is a strip mall located on the former site of DePiero's Farm that opened on September 24, 2017. It is located just off exit 172 of the Garden State Parkway, directly across from the former Mercedes-Benz headquarters office. Notable tenants include the first location of Wegmans in Bergen County. Due to state blue laws in effect in Bergen County, most retail stores in the strip mall are closed on Sundays except for grocery stores and restaurants.

Government

Local government
Montvale is governed under the Borough form of New Jersey municipal government, which is used in 218 municipalities (of the 564) statewide, making it the most common form of government in New Jersey. The governing body is comprised of a Mayor and a Borough Council, with all positions elected at-large on a partisan basis as part of the November general election. A Mayor is elected directly by the voters to a four-year term of office. The Borough Council is comprised of six members elected to serve three-year terms on a staggered basis, with two seats coming up for election each year in a three-year cycle. The Borough form of government used by Montvale is a "weak mayor / strong council" government in which council members act as the legislative body with the mayor presiding at meetings and voting only in the event of a tie. The mayor can veto ordinances subject to an override by a two-thirds majority vote of the council. The mayor makes committee and liaison assignments for council members, and most appointments are made by the mayor with the advice and consent of the council.

The Mayor and Council meet every second Tuesday of the month for formal public meetings and on the last Tuesday of the month for informal work sessions. Meetings are open to the public and residents are given the opportunity to speak on proposed ordinances and other matters of concern at the formal meetings. Government-access television (GATV) usually televises the first meeting of each month on the local Public-access television cable TV channel.

The Mayor is the chief executive officer of the Borough, and as such presides over all public meetings, provides leadership in the development of community projects and makes appointments to various boards. The Borough Council exercises all legislative powers including adoption of the municipal budget, bond ordinances and the general business of the community.

The council's powers include adoption of ordinances; reviewing, revising and adopting the budget; making appropriations; levying taxes; authorizing bond issues; providing for the internal structure of local government; providing by ordinance for the creation and abolition of jobs; fixing salaries and establishing general municipal policy.

, the Mayor of Montvale Borough is Republican Michael Ghassali, whose term of office ends December 31, 2023. The Montvale Borough Council is comprised of Council President Douglas M. Arendacs (R, 2023), Theresa Sileo Cudequest (R, 2023; elected to serve an unexpired term), Dieter Koelling (R, 2024), Timothy E. Lane (R, 2025), Christopher A. Roche (R, 2025), and Annmarie Russo-Vogelsang (R, 2024).

In December 2021, the council appointed former councilmember Theresa Cudequest from a list of three names nominated by the Republican municipal committee to fill the seat expiring in December 2023 that had been held by Rose Curry until she resigned from office. Cudequest served on an interim basis until the November 2022 general election, when voters chose her to serve the balance of the term of office.

Federal, state and county representation
Montvale is located in the 5th Congressional District and is part of New Jersey's 39th state legislative district.

Politics
As of March 2011, there were a total of 5,132 registered voters in Montvale, of which 1,080 (21.0% vs. 31.7% countywide) were registered as Democrats, 1,546 (30.1% vs. 21.1%) were registered as Republicans and 2,499 (48.7% vs. 47.1%) were registered as Unaffiliated. There were 7 voters registered as Libertarians or Greens. Among the borough's 2010 Census population, 65.4% (vs. 57.1% in Bergen County) were registered to vote, including 89.3% of those ages 18 and over (vs. 73.7% countywide).

In the 2020 presidential election, Democrat Joe Biden received 2,696 votes, ahead of Republican Donald Trump who received 2,437 votes (51.4% to 46.4%). In the 2016 presidential election, Republican Donald Trump received 2,221 votes (51.0% vs. 41.1% countywide), ahead of Democrat Hillary Clinton with 1,960 votes (45.0% vs. 54.2%) and other candidates with 178 votes (4.1% vs. 4.6%), among the 4,402 ballots cast by the borough's 5,780 registered voters, for a turnout of 76.2% (vs. 72.5% in Bergen County). In the 2012 presidential election, Republican Mitt Romney received 2,275 votes (56.1% vs. 43.5% countywide), ahead of Democrat Barack Obama with 1,718 votes (42.3% vs. 54.8%) and other candidates with 39 votes (1.0% vs. 0.9%), among the 4,057 ballots cast by the borough's 5,494 registered voters, for a turnout of 73.8% (vs. 70.4% in Bergen County). 

In the 2013 gubernatorial election, Republican Chris Christie received 69.5% of the vote (1,714 cast), ahead of Democrat Barbara Buono with 29.5% (728 votes), and other candidates with 0.9% (23 votes), among the 2,514 ballots cast by the borough's 5,299 registered voters (49 ballots were spoiled), for a turnout of 47.4%. In the 2009 gubernatorial election, Republican Chris Christie received 1,590 votes (57.9% vs. 45.8% countywide), ahead of Democrat Jon Corzine with 972 votes (35.4% vs. 48.0%), Independent Chris Daggett with 133 votes (4.8% vs. 4.7%) and other candidates with 15 votes (0.5% vs. 0.5%), among the 2,744 ballots cast by the borough's 5,197 registered voters, yielding a 52.8% turnout (vs. 50.0% in the county).

Emergency services
Montvale has a volunteer fire department that was established in 1924. The department consists of a chief, an assistant chief, two captain companies, and two lieutenant companies. The station is home to Engine 1, Engine 2, Engine 4, and Tower 5.

Along with Park Ridge and Woodcliff Lake, Montvale is one of the communities that is part of the Tri-Boro Volunteer Ambulance Corps, founded in 1938 and provides EMS service to these three communities. Tri-Boro is a non-profit and full volunteer group which provides free emergency service to those in the community who need it at any time. Its headquarters is located in Park Ridge near Mill Pond.

Montvale has its own police department. The police station is located in the Borough Hall on Mercedes Drive.

Montvale's Office of Emergency Management participates bi-monthly in the Radio Amateur Civil Emergency Service (RACES) drills in Bergen County, New Jersey. The Emergency Operations Center (EOC) is located in the Borough Hall on Mercedes Drive. The Montvale OEM consists of one OEM Coordinator, one Deputy OEM Coordinator, a team of RACES members and a Community emergency response team.

Education
The Montvale Public Schools serve students in pre-kindergarten through eighth grade. As of the 2018–19 school year, the district, comprised of two schools, had an enrollment of 980 students and 88.0 classroom teachers (on an FTE basis), for a student–teacher ratio of 11.1:1. Schools in the district (with 2018–19 enrollment data from the National Center for Education Statistics) are 
Memorial Elementary School with 519 students in grades Pre-K through 4 and 
Fieldstone Middle School with 451 students in grades 5 to 8.

Public school students from Montvale in ninth through twelfth grades attend Pascack Hills High School along with students from neighboring Woodcliff Lake. The school is part of the Pascack Valley Regional High School District, which also serves students from Hillsdale and River Vale. Pascack Hills High School was the 7th-ranked public high school in New Jersey out of 339 schools statewide, in New Jersey Monthly magazine's September 2014 cover story on the state's "Top Public High Schools", after being ranked 18th in 2012 out of 328 schools. As of the 2018–19 school year, the high school had an enrollment of 842 students and 70.0 classroom teachers (on an FTE basis), for a student–teacher ratio of 12.0:1. Seats on the high-school district's nine-member board of education are allocated based on the population of the constituent municipalities, with two seats assigned to Montvale.

Public school students from the borough, and all of Bergen County, are eligible to attend the secondary education programs offered by the Bergen County Technical Schools, which include the Bergen County Academies in Hackensack, and the Bergen Tech campus in Teterboro or Paramus. The district offers programs on a shared-time or full-time basis, with admission based on a selective application process and tuition covered by the student's home school district.

Montvale is the home of Saint Joseph Regional High School, a college preparatory school for young men founded in 1962 in the Xaverian tradition of Catholic education, operating under the supervision of the Roman Catholic Archdiocese of Newark.

Transportation

Roads and highways

The Garden State Parkway and County Route 503 pass through Montvale. The last stop going north on the Garden State Parkway before heading towards New York and the New York Thruway is in Montvale and features a large rest stop area.

Public transportation
Montvale is served by NJ Transit at the Montvale train station, located at the intersection of Kinderkamack Road and Grand Avenue. The station offers service on the Pascack Valley Line, which runs north–south to Hoboken Terminal with connections via the Secaucus Junction transfer station to New Jersey Transit one-stop service to New York Penn Station and to other NJ Transit rail service. Connections are available at the Hoboken Terminal to other New Jersey Transit rail lines, the PATH train at the Hoboken PATH station, New York Waterways ferry service to the World Financial Center and other destinations and Hudson-Bergen Light Rail service.

Rockland Coaches provides service on routes 11T/AT, 14ET and 45/46/47 to the Port Authority Bus Terminal in Midtown Manhattan. Saddle River Tours / Ameribus provides service to the George Washington Bridge Bus Station on route 11C.

Entertainment
Montvale formerly had a roller skating rink called The Rink. It closed in 2007 and was a replaced by a condominium complex.

Montvale Lanes includes 38 lanes of bowling.

Notable people

People who were born in, residents of, or otherwise closely associated with Montvale include:

 Dana Bash (born 1971), CNN Capitol Hill journalist
 Marco Capozzoli (born 1988), placekicker for the Jacksonville Sharks of the Arena Football League (AFL)
 Christopher Catalfo (born 1959), former wrestler who competed in the 1984 Summer Olympics
 Tim Catalfo (born 1959), former amateur wrestling standout, professional wrestler and mixed martial artist
 Mary Dunleavy (born 1966), operatic soprano
 Alecko Eskandarian (born 1982), professional soccer player
 Edith Margaret Faulstich (1907–1972), philatelist and philatelic journalist who specialized in postal history and postal covers
 Jeff Hafley (born 1979), defensive backs coach of the San Francisco 49ers of the National Football League (NFL)
 Aline Brosh McKenna (born 1967), screenwriter
 Zac Moncrief (born 1971), director of Family Guy, Phineas and Ferb and other cartoons
 Liliko Ogasawara (born 1972), former international competitor in judo who represented the United States in Judo at the 1996 Summer Olympics
 Kyle Palmieri (born 1991), right winger who has played in the NHL for the New York Islanders and New Jersey Devils
 Scottie Scheffler (born 1996), professional golfer on the PGA Tour, who has been ranked as the World No. 1 Golfer
 Kieran Scott (born 1974), author of chick lit and young adult books, including Private and I Was a Non-Blonde Cheerleader
 Charlotte Vandervalk (born 1937), represented Montvale in the New Jersey General Assembly from 1991 to 2012 and served on the Montvale Township Council from 1980 to 1985
 Jeffrey Vinokur (born 1990),  science educator who combines hip-hop dance popping with live science demonstrations as "The Dancing Scientist"
 Shaun Weiss (born 1978), actor who played "Goldberg" in The Mighty Ducks film series
 Jacob R. Wortendyke (1818–1880), Congressman who represented  from 1857 to 1859
 Heather Zurich (born 1987), assistant coach and recruiting coordinator for the Long Island University Blackbirds women's basketball team

Annual events

Each Memorial Day, the Tri-Boro area consisting of Montvale, Woodcliff Lake, and Park Ridge all participate in the annual Memorial Day Parade.

Since the 1920s, Santa arrives every Christmas Eve in the park on a fire truck and distributes stockings and toys to each child.

In late June there is a Day in the Park featuring, rides for the children, contests, food, and live music, concluding with fireworks.

In October, the Montvale Chamber of Commerce holds the annual Montvale Street Fair.

On September 11, a candle-lit Memorial Service is held. In 2021, a monument was erected in honor of those who died in the September 11, 2001, terrorist attacks.

References

Further reading 

 Municipal Incorporations of the State of New Jersey (according to Counties) prepared by the Division of Local Government, Department of the Treasury (New Jersey); December 1, 1958.
 Clayton, W. Woodford; and Nelson, William. History of Bergen and Passaic Counties, New Jersey, with Biographical Sketches of Many of its Pioneers and Prominent Men., Philadelphia: Everts and Peck, 1882.
 Harvey, Cornelius Burnham (ed.), Genealogical History of Hudson and Bergen Counties, New Jersey. New York: New Jersey Genealogical Publishing Co., 1900.
 Van Valen, James M. History of Bergen County, New Jersey. New York: New Jersey Publishing and Engraving Co., 1900.
 Westervelt, Frances A. (Frances Augusta), 1858–1942, History of Bergen County, New Jersey, 1630–1923, Lewis Historical Publishing Company, 1923.

External links

 Montvale official website
 Montvale Public Schools
 
 School Data for the Montvale Public Schools, National Center for Education Statistics
 Greater Pascack Valley Chamber of Commerce website
 Pascack Valley Regional High School District

 
1894 establishments in New Jersey
Borough form of New Jersey government
Boroughs in Bergen County, New Jersey
Pascack Valley
Populated places established in 1894